Helen Ball  (born April 1961) is a retired senior British police officer. During part of her final year in policing she served as Acting Deputy Commissioner of the Metropolitan Police Service. At a national level she has been senior coordinator for counter terrorism policing (2013–2016) and strategic leadership advisor to the College of Policing (seconded 2016).

Career 
Ball first became a police officer in 1987 as part of the Metropolitan Police, rising to the rank of Operational Command Unit Commander in 2007 and remaining with them until 2010. She then transferred to become Thames Valley Police Assistant Chief Constable, leading on Crime and Criminal Justice, and remained there for two years before returning to the Met as Deputy Assistant Commissioner for Territorial Policing. She is the current trustee of the government-funded charity Police Now.

In March 2019, Ball chaired a disciplinary hearing of PC Terry Malka, convicted of outraging public decency by masturbating while traveling on a train, which decided to issue a final written warning rather than sacking him. As of February 2023, Malka was still serving with the force; this is being reviewed by the Metropolitan Police as part of an internal review into historic sex allegations.

In December 2021, after a coroner's hearing into the 2014–15 murders by Stephen Port, Ball admitted that "a number of recent events" had damaged trust in the Metropolitan Police. Later that month 2021 Ball chaired a misconduct panel which dismissed Jamie Rayner, a police constable already jailed for assaulting and strangling his partner during a 'controlling and coercive' relationship. After the activist Kate Wilson won £229,471 civil damages from the Metropolitan Police in January 2022 for being deceived into a sexual relationship with an undercover police officer, Ball acknowledged the "gravity of the judgment" and that the police had breached Wilson's human rights.

Following the resignation of the incumbent Commissioner of the Metropolitan Police in April 2022, Stephen House has acted as Commissioner and while Ball has acted as Deputy Commissioner while the Home Office and Mayor of London recruit a permanent replacement. In August 2022 she announced her intention to retire in October that year.

Honours

References 

1961 births
Living people
Assistant Commissioners of Police of the Metropolis
English recipients of the Queen's Police Medal
Metropolitan Police recipients of the Queen's Police Medal
Counterterrorism in the United Kingdom
Women Metropolitan Police officers
20th-century births